Fyodor Abramovich Blinov (25 July 1827, Saratov Oblast – 24 June 1902 Saratov Oblasts, Russia) was a Russian inventor who introduced one of the first tracked vehicles (a wagon on continuous tracks) in 1877 (patented in 1879), and then developed his idea and built the first steam-powered continuous track tractor for farm usage (1881–1888). His self-propelled crawler was successfully tested and displayed at farmer's exhibition in 1896.

See also 
 List of Russian inventors

References 

Inventors from the Russian Empire
1827 births
1902 deaths